Aeroflot Flight 2003 was operated on 3 January 1976 by a Tupolev Tu-124, registration СССР-45037, when it crashed 7 km after take-off from Moscow–Vnukovo Airport (VKO/UUWW), on a domestic flight to Minsk-1 International Airport (MHP/UMMM), and Brest Airport (BQT/UMBB), Belarus. The crash killed all sixty-one on board and one in a house on the ground.

Description of the accident
The aircraft was on initial climb-out following take-off; as it entered clouds both artificial horizons failed, so the crew had no visual reference. The aircraft banked to the left, dived and crashed into a house 7 km from Vnukovo International Airport.

See also

Aeroflot accidents and incidents
Aeroflot accidents and incidents in the 1970s

References

Aviation accidents and incidents in 1976
1976 in the Soviet Union
Aviation accidents and incidents in the Soviet Union
2003
Accidents and incidents involving the Tupolev Tu-124
Vnukovo International Airport
Transport disasters in Moscow
January 1976 events in Europe